Wightman is an unincorporated community in Mecklenburg County, Virginia, United States.

Notes

Unincorporated communities in Mecklenburg County, Virginia
Unincorporated communities in Virginia